Bananas is the tenth studio album by Scottish singer-songwriter Malcolm Middleton, and the seventh under his own name. It was released on 28 September 2018 on Triassic Tusk Records.

Cover and title

In an interview with For The Rabbits, an alternative music website, Middleton suggests that the title is "a stupid fucking name for an album" and dismisses any suggestion that it may be a nod to the The Velvet Underground's debut album: "[T]he last few years I've started sketching, I mean I can't draw to save my life, but I started doing it and I was really bad but I found a lot of pleasure in doing it and the first thing I drew was these bananas".

Background and Recording
Bananas represented a return to a more simple recording, and marked a clear departure from the sound of Middleton's previous record, Summer of '13. Speaking of the recording of the songs, Middleton said that "most of the songs on this record were written in two different days … feeling a certain way, feeling like shit and just mental things, that’s when words tend to come out for me. I don’t normally sit and write when I’m really happy”.

Tour

Middleton toured the album as part of the Malcolm Goes Bananas winter tour in November and December 2018, and included gigs in the United Kingdom and Ireland.

Track listing
All tracks written by Malcolm Middleton.
"Gut Feeling" – 5:30
"Love Is A Momentary Lapse In Self-Loathing" – 5:16
"What A Life" – 2:11
"Buzz Lightyear Helmet" – 8:09
"Twilight Zone" – 5:11
"That Voice Again" – 4:14
"Man Up, Man Down" – 5:58
"Salamander Gray" – 5:21

Personnel
Malcolm Middleton – vocals, guitars
David Jeans – drums
Stevie Jones – double piano
Graeme Smillie - piano, synths, bass guitar
Kenny Anderson, Jenny Reeve, Dan Wilson - backing vocals
Paul Savage - additional drums

References

External links
 Interview with Malcolm discussing the album

2018 albums
Full Time Hobby albums
Malcolm Middleton albums